Prizeo is a privately owned internet company based in Los Angeles, California. It is an online fundraising platform that enables clients to mobilize their fan bases to raise funds and awareness for their chosen causes.

In June 2015, it was announced that Prizeo had been acquired by tech mogul Todd Wagner. The terms of the deal were not disclosed. Prizeo is a member of Wagner’s Charity Network, which is also the parent company to leading charity auction site Charitybuzz and strategy consulting firm Global Philanthropy Group.

History

As undergraduates at Oxford University, co-founders Bryan Baum and Leo Seigal worked with the Aloysius Society, a philanthropic group that organized high-priced charity events. The society raised $1 million running auctions, but Baum and Seigal were frustrated at the cost of their fundraising strategy and the lack of scale. In 2012, the duo teamed up with co-founder Andrej Pancik and Lukas Bosko to create Prizeo, a sweepstakes platform to help nonprofits raise funds and awareness.

In January 2013, Prizeo participated in the technology start-up incubator Y Combinator’s Winter 2013 program.

Campaigns

Since launching, the platform has held nearly 200 sweepstakes campaigns featuring once-in-a-lifetime experiences and raising more than $50M for hundreds of charities. Prizeo campaigns have featured celebrities such as Lin-Manuel Miranda, Ellen Degeneres, Tom Brady, Martha Stewart, Imagine Dragons, Tiger Woods, Tyler Oakley, Lady Gaga and many more.

References 

Companies based in Los Angeles
American companies established in 2013
American fundraising websites
Crowdfunding platforms of the United States